Davide Pagliarani  (born 25 October 1970) is an Italian traditionalist Catholic priest of the Society of Saint Pius X (SSPX) who has served as its superior general since 2018.

Pagliarani entered the SSPX's seminary in Flavigny-sur-Ozerain in 1989. Following his studies, he completed military service. Pagliarani was ordained a priest of the SSPX in 1996 by the then-Superior General, Bishop Bernard Fellay. Fr. Pagliarani ministered in Rimini for seven years, before being transferred to Singapore for a further three years. He then served as superior of the District of Italy between 2006 and 2012, becoming rector of the Nuestra Señora Corredentora Seminary in the Province of Buenos Aires from 2012.

On July 11, 2018, at the SSPX's general chapter, Pagliarani was elected superior general of the Society for a 12-year term, succeeding Bishop Fellay. Pagliarani is reputed to advocate a more hardline approach concerning Vatican relations relative to Fellay's approach, yet he did meet with Cardinal Luis Ladaria Ferrer, president of the Ecclesia Dei Commission, on November 2, 2018, at the Vatican.

Pagliarani is known to be an outspoken critic of Pope Francis. Even before his election as superior general, he had already criticized and denounced Francis' 2016 apostolic exhortation Amoris laetitia. Following the events that occurred at the 2019 Amazon synod, Pagliarani called for "a day of prayer and reparation" and called the synod "demonic" and "idolatrous." In October 2020, Pagliarani criticized the encyclical Laudato si' for its reduction of Christian sanctity to environmentalism, ecumenism of the Document on Human Fraternity and its extension to the encyclical Fratelli tutti. Recently, Pagliarani lamented on the motu proprio Traditionis custodes promulgated by Francis in July 2021 restricting the use of the Tridentine Mass. In a sermon delivered at Mass on July 18, 2021, Pagliarani asked, "Why is this Mass the 'apple of discord'? Why does this Mass divide?" and criticized the pope once more, saying, "The pope and his accomplices are the jail guards of tradition. They are guardians of the zoo." Pagliarani also issued a communiqué regarding the motu proprio in which he stated, "This Mass, our Mass, must really be for us like the pearl of great price in the Gospel, for which we are ready to renounce everything, for which we are ready to sell everything."

References

External links

Society of Pope St. Pius X

1970 births
Living people
People from Rimini
Members of the Society of Saint Pius X
Italian traditionalist Catholics
Traditionalist Catholic priests